Trophinin-associated protein is a protein that in humans is encoded by the TROAP gene.

Interactions 

TROAP has been shown to interact with BYSL.

References

Further reading

External links